Autumn Glory (Malus domestica 'Huaguan') is an apple cultivar developed by growers based in Washington state, US and released in 2011. The fruit is grown by Domex Superfresh Growers with a production of about 56,000 trees as of November 2014. Autumn Glory apples are described to feature a stronger and sweeter apple flavor with a hint of cinnamon. This variety is a hybrid of the Fuji (apple) and Golden Delicious apple, where the original pollination cross breed was made by Dr. Yu Lin Wang in 1976 and it is harvested in mid to late October of each year.

References

American apples
Apple cultivars
Apple production in Washington (state)